"Waves" is a song by English synth-pop duo Blancmange, released on 21 January 1983 as the fourth and final single from their debut studio album Happy Families (1982). Written by Neil Arthur and Stephen Luscombe, and produced by Mike Howlett, "Waves" reached No. 19 in the UK and remained in the charts for nine weeks.

In a 2016 interview with M Magazine, Arthur recalled of writing the song: "I had a summer job where I had to sit in this caravan handing out concrete slabs to builders. Most of the day I did nothing. It was a glorious summer and I just sat and wrote "I've Seen the Word", "I Can't Explain", "Waves". They were so minimal but Stephen laid these lovely melodies over the top."

Critical reception
Upon its release, Smash Hits wrote, "After the brilliant 'Living on the Ceiling', this is rotten. Neil Arthur puts on his Martin Fry tuxedo, dives head-first into the sea of strings... and drowns." In a retrospective review of Happy Families (1982), John Bergstrom of PopMatters considered the song to be reminiscent of ABC and described it as "grandiose, orchestrated pop". Graeme Marsh of musicOMH felt the song was "more serious sounding" and a "slower gem".

Track listing
7" single
 "Waves" – 4:10
 "Game Above My Head" – 4:00

12" single
 "Waves" – 4:06
 "Business Steps" – 4:27
 "Game Above My Head (Extended Version)" – 7:15

12" single (Australasian release)
 "Waves (Full Length Dance Version)" – 8:34
 "Living on the Ceiling" – 5:35

Personnel
Blancmange
 Neil Arthur – lead vocals, producer of "Game Above My Head"
 Stephen Luscombe – keyboards, synthesizers, producer of "Game Above My Head" and "Business Steps"

Additional personnel
 Madeline Bell, Stevie Lange – backing vocals on "Waves"
 Bobby Collins – bass on "Game Above My Head"
 Mike Howlett – producer of "Waves"
 Linton Naiff – string arrangement on "Waves"
 Dennis Weinrich – remixing of "Waves"
 John Owen Williams – remixing of "Waves", producer of "Game Above My Head"

Other
 Keith Breeden, Blancmange – sleeve design
 Helen Turner, Peter Ashworth – photography

Charts

References

External links
 

1983 songs
1983 singles
Blancmange (band) songs
London Records singles
Songs written by Neil Arthur
Songs written by Stephen Luscombe
Song recordings produced by Mike Howlett